Pristimantis ginesi is a species of frog in the family Strabomantidae.

It is endemic to Venezuela.
Its natural habitat is tropical high-altitude grassland.
It is threatened by habitat loss.

References 

ginesi
Amphibians of the Andes
Amphibians of Venezuela
Endemic fauna of Venezuela
Amphibians described in 1964
Taxonomy articles created by Polbot